Hivange is a village in the commune of Garnich, in western Luxembourg.  , the village has a population of 117.  Nearby is the source of the Mamer.

Garnich
Villages in Luxembourg